Saundersiops is a genus of parasitic flies in the family Tachinidae. There are about 15 described species in Saundersiops.

Species
These 15 species belong to the genus Saundersiops:

 Saundersiops brownae Curran, 1947
 Saundersiops cayensis Townsend, 1914
 Saundersiops colombiensis Curran, 1947
 Saundersiops confluens Townsend, 1914
 Saundersiops cruciatus Townsend, 1914
 Saundersiops lineata Townsend
 Saundersiops maculiventris (Brethes, 1909)
 Saundersiops nigricornis Townsend
 Saundersiops oculatus Curran, 1947
 Saundersiops pachecoi Curran, 1947
 Saundersiops schwarzi Curran, 1947
 Saundersiops siestus Curran, 1947
 Saundersiops simillimus Townsend, 1914
 Saundersiops spinosus (Townsend, 1931)
 Saundersiops tatei Curran, 1947

References

Further reading

 
 
 
 

Tachinidae
Articles created by Qbugbot